Peter John Koutoujian (born September 17, 1961) is an American politician who is the current Sheriff of Middlesex County, Massachusetts and a former member of the Massachusetts House of Representatives.

Massachusetts House of Representatives
Koutoujian is of Armenian ancestry. A former Assistant District Attorney in Middlesex County, Koutoujian was elected to the Massachusetts House of Representatives in 1996. From 2001–2005, he was a member of Joint Committee on Health Care and was the chairman of the Committee from 2003–2005. From 2005–2009, he was the Chair of the Joint Committee on Public Health. From 2009 until his departure from the House, he was the Chair of Joint Committee on Financial Services.

Sheriff of Middlesex County
On January 14, 2011, Koutoujian was appointed by Governor Deval Patrick to fill the term of Middlesex County Sheriff James DiPaola, who died on November 26, 2010.

Congressional campaign

Koutoujian was a candidate for the Democratic nomination in the 2013 special election for the U.S. House of Representatives. He ran to succeed Ed Markey as the U.S. representative for Massachusetts's 5th district.  He finished second in the Democratic primary.

References

External links
Peter Koutoujian for Congress
Middlesex Sheriff Peter J. Koutoujian official government site
Peter Koutoujian for Middlesex Sheriff 
 

1961 births
Living people
American people of Armenian descent
Bridgewater State University alumni
Harvard Kennedy School alumni
New England Law Boston alumni
Massachusetts School of Law faculty
Sheriffs of Middlesex County, Massachusetts
Democratic Party members of the Massachusetts House of Representatives
Politicians from Newton, Massachusetts
American people of Irish descent
Ethnic Armenian politicians
Massachusetts sheriffs